A clutch delay valve is an automotive component added to the clutch system of an automobile to standardize clutch engagement speed.  Its purpose is to engage the drive train of an automobile without introducing shock to the drive train components by engaging too quickly.  By preventing drive train shock, CDVs also prevent an automobile's balance from being upset, which aids in handling characteristics.

Clutch delay valves operate on the principle that engagement only needs to occur at a certain rate to be efficient and that engaging at a quicker rate can damage the drive train components of an automobile.  Engaging the drive train to the engine too quickly can damage drive train parts, including the transmission, differential, half shafts, axles, and CV joints. Engaging the drive train too slowly can damage the clutch friction disc and cause clutch slippage.

Clutch delay valves operate as one-way restrictor valves that limit the volume of fluid that can move through the lines in a given time.  This ensures a steady quick and firm engagement without being too fast for the drive train to handle since clutches can quickly disengage but re-engagement is damped. The clutch delay valve slows clutch engagement and was intended to reduce drivetrain shock in the event that an inexperienced driver quickly engaged the clutch at higher revs.

BMW have used clutch delay valves on the E39 and E46 models, and others, from 1997. These valves have been unpopular with some drivers and they are sometimes removed to leave a conventional clutch action. The BMW valve is a separate pipe fitting and easily removed. Honda have also used such valves on some Civic models, but these are integral to the clutch slave cylinder and must be dismantled in situ.

References 

Valves